The Spring Brook House is a historic brick building located at 161 James Street in the town of Morristown in Morris County, New Jersey. Part of the Morristown Multiple Resource Area (MRA), it was added to the National Register of Historic Places on November 13, 1986, for its significance in architecture and commerce. The house is currently a retreat, the Loyola Jesuit Center in Morristown.

History and description
In 1865, John T. Foote (1818–1902), businessman from Cincinnati, moved to Morristown. His son Robert D. Foote (1863–1924) inherited the property, Spring Brook Farms, and built Spring Brook House between 1904 and 1906. The two and one-half story house was designed by architects George A. Freeman and Francis George Hasselman and features Georgian Revival style. In 1921, Foote sold , which became the Spring Brook Country Club. In 1927, Foote's estate donated the house to the Society of Jesus and it became the Loyola House of Retreats.

See also
 National Register of Historic Places listings in Morris County, New Jersey

References

Morristown, New Jersey
Houses in Morris County, New Jersey
National Register of Historic Places in Morris County, New Jersey
Houses on the National Register of Historic Places in New Jersey
Houses completed in 1906
1906 establishments in New Jersey
Georgian Revival architecture in New Jersey
Brick buildings and structures
New Jersey Register of Historic Places
Spiritual retreats